The  men's 1500 metre freestyle was one of 6 swimming events on the swimming at the 1908 Summer Olympics programme. Its distance was the longest of the 3 individual freestyle event distances. The competition was held from Tuesday July 21, 1908, to Saturday July 25, 1908.

Each nation could enter up to 12 swimmers. Nineteen swimmers from eight nations competed.

Records

These were the standing world and Olympic records (in minutes) prior to the 1908 Summer Olympics.

(*) one mile (1609.34 m)

In the final Henry Taylor set the first official world record for this distance in 22:48.4.

Competition format

With a much larger field than in 1904, the 1908 competition expanded to three rounds: heats, semifinals, and a final. The 1908 Games also restored the wild-card system from 1900, allowing the fastest swimmers who did not win their heat to advance. The seven heats consisted of between 1 and 4 swimmers, with the winner of the heat advancing along with the fastest loser from across the heats (all tied swimmers advanced in the case of equal times). There were two semifinals of 4 swimmers each; the top 2 finishers in each semifinal (regardless of overall time) advanced to the 4-person final.

Each race involved 15 lengths of the 100 metre pool. Any stroke could be used.

Results

First round

Tuesday July 21, 1908: The fastest swimmer in each heat and the fastest loser advanced, qualifying eight swimmers for the semifinals.

Heat 1

Heat 2

Heat 3

Moist had no competition in the third heat.

Heat 4

Heat 5

Heat 6

Heat 7

Foster had no competition in the seventh heat.

Semifinals

Thursday July 23, 1908: The fastest two swimmers from each semifinal advanced to the final.

Semifinal 1

Semifinal 2

Final

The final was held on Saturday July 25, 1908.

While Taylor stopped after the finish, Battersby swam an extra 109.344 metres after the finish to complete the mile. His time for the mile was 24:33.0, breaking the standing record of 24:42.6 set by David Billington in 1905.

References

Sources
 
 

Men's freestyle 1500 metres